James Graham, 1st Duke and 4th Marquess of Montrose (April 16827 January 1742) was a Scottish aristocratic statesman in the early eighteenth century.

Life

He was the only son of James Graham, 3rd Marquess of Montrose and Lady Christian Leslie. On 31 March 1702 he married Christian, daughter of David Carnegie, 3rd Earl of Northesk. Together, they had several sons, including William Graham and Lord George Graham.

Originally the fourth Marquess of Montrose, James was elevated to a dukedom in 1707, as a reward for his important support of the Act of Union, whilst being Lord President of the Scottish Privy Council. He was Lord High Admiral of Scotland from 1705 to 1706. He was Keeper of the Privy Seal of Scotland from 1709 to 1713 and served as Keeper of the Great Seal of Scotland from 1716 to 1733. He was also a Lord of the Regency for Great Britain in 1714, upon the death of Queen Anne. Furthermore, he served briefly as Secretary of State for Scotland at the time of the Georgian ministry of Lord Townshend. In 1719 he was one of the main subscribers to the Royal Academy of Music (1719), a corporation that produced baroque opera on the stage. He served as a Governor of London's Foundling Hospital at the time of its foundation in 1739. For much of his adult life he was Chancellor of the University of Glasgow.

Apart from his political career, he was a primary creditor of Robert Roy MacGregor, who blamed the Duke for his financial ruin; MacGregor then carried out a feud with Graham for some years. Montrose was responsible for corruption charges, earning himself unpopularity through the famous Jacobite.

On his death Graham was buried at Aberuthven. The grave is within Montrose Mausoleum.

Issue 
 James Graham, Lord Graham (7 April 1703–2 March 1704)
 David Graham, 1st Earl Graham (8 June 1705–30 September 1731)
 Lord Christian Graham (29 Oct 1706–30 May 1711)
 Lady Elizabeth Graham (23 April 1708–17 February 1711)
 Lord John Graham (9 April 1709–19 March 1710)
 Lord James Graham (26 March 1710–3 April 1711)
 Lord Thomas Graham (7 March 1711–27 December 1711)
 William Graham, 2nd Duke of Montrose (27 Aug 1712–23 September 1790)
 Lady Margaret Graham (5 June 1714–1 April 1729)
 Captain Lord George Graham (26 September 1715–2 January 1747)

In popular culture
In Harold French's Rob Roy, the Highland Rogue, Graham is played by Michael Gough.

In Michael Caton-Jones's Rob Roy, Graham is played by John Hurt. In this depiction he is referred to as 'Marquess of Montrose' despite his title being raised to a dukedom in 1707.

Ancestry

References

1682 births
1742 deaths
Keepers of the Great Seal of Scotland
201
Secretaries of State for Scotland
Presidents of the Privy Council of Scotland
Scottish representative peers
Chancellors of the University of Glasgow
Fellows of the Royal Society
Commissioners of the Treasury of Scotland
17th-century Scottish peers